Bambi's Dilemma is the sixth studio album by Melt-Banana, released on April 24, 2007. It was released on CD and vinyl. The album's title came from an incident which happened when vocalist Yasuko was driving the band's touring van in the US and hit a deer, and kept thinking about the character Bambi from the film of the same name.

Track listing

Audio samples 
Thirty-second audio samples can be found [ here] on AllMusic.

References 

Melt-Banana albums
2007 albums